PangPond is a Thai cartoon character created by Pakdee Saentaweesuk. He is a five-year-old boy with large round eyes and three strands of hair on his head. He is an ordinary boy with an active imagination and a hyperactive personality. His curiosity often gets him into trouble, but he always finds a way out.

PangPond first appeared in Cartoon Mahasanook, a well-known Thai comic book with a circulation of more than 350,000 copies per week. The character is currently published in his own comic book.

Since 2002, Banlue Group (Banluesarn's head office) has broadcast 3D animated comics featuring PangPond in IMAX and on Channel 3 (Thailand).

PangPond Animation 

PangPond the Series was first created and shown in 3d animation in 2002 by Banlue Group on Channel 3 (Thailand) on April 3, 2002. 
After that, PangPond The Movie was released in IMAX Theaters on the 10th anniversary of PangPond: The Series. This was the first Thai movie created in 3D animation. In March 2008, PangPond was appointed to  be a Global Warming Ambassador by the Thai Ministry of Natural Resources and Environment which was a campaign to help inform children and youth about global warming. In September 2008, Net Leader Company distribute the character PangPond to show Thailand's animation Asia Pacific.

References

External links
 Vithita Animation's PangPond to air in Asia (6 cities) on YR channel

Thai animated television series
Thai comics
Animated television series about children
Animated television series about families
Fictional Thai people